Anja Schreiner is a professional female bodybuilder from Germany.

Bodybuilding career

Amateur
She began lifting weights to combat scoliosis in her adolescence.

Professional
Anja won a narrow victory at the 1991 Ms. International, when she topped Tonya Knight by a score of 30 to 32. It was the first most narrowest victory at the Ms. International.

Retirement
Anja retired from competitive bodybuilding in 1992, but kept having appearances at FIBO and Olympia events.

Legacy
Currently she is the most successful German bodybuilder of all time.

Contest history 
1986 Miss Germany - 1st
1989 Pro World Championship - 21st
1989 Ms. International - 11th
1990 Ms. International - 3rd
1990 IFBB Ms. Olympia - 3rd
1991 Ms. International - 2nd
1991 IFBB Ms. Olympia - 8th
1992 Ms. International - 1st
1992 IFBB Ms. Olympia - 6th

Filmography

Soldier of Fortune, INC (1997, 1 episode)
Die Kommisarin (2000, 1 episode)
Personal Trainer (2001 german film)

References

| colspan = 3 align = center | Ms. International
|-
| width = 30% align = center | Preceded by:Tonya Knight
| width = 40% align = center | First (1992)
| width = 30% align = center | Succeeded by:Kim Chizevsky-Nicholls

1967 births

German female bodybuilders

Living people
Professional bodybuilders